Nowa Ligota  is a village in the administrative district of Gmina Oleśnica, within Oleśnica County, Lower Silesian Voivodeship, in south-western Poland. Prior to 1945 it was in Germany. As of 2011, the village had a population of 76.

References

Nowa Ligota